Sonmatha is a village in Ye Township in the Mon State of south-east Myanmar. It is located approximately 8 kilometres directly north of Ye city.

Nearby towns and villages include Zuntalin (2.2 nm), Hmeinsein (1.4 nm), Sakale (3.2 nm), Awaing (2.2 nm), Zayat (2.0 nm) and Pawtaw (1.4 nm).

Populated places in Mon State